Common metre or common measure—abbreviated as C. M. or CM—is a  poetic metre consisting of four lines that alternate between iambic tetrameter (four metrical feet per line) and iambic trimeter (three metrical feet per line), with each foot consisting of an unstressed syllable followed by a stressed syllable. The metre is denoted by the syllable count of each line, i.e. 8.6.8.6, 86.86, or 86 86, depending on style, or by its shorthand abbreviation "CM".

Common metre has been used for ballads such as "Tam Lin" and hymns such as "Amazing Grace" and the Christmas carol "O Little Town of Bethlehem". The upshot of this commonality is that lyrics of one song can be sung to the tune of another; for example, "Advance Australia Fair", "House of the Rising Sun", Pokémon Theme and "Amazing Grace" can have their lyrics set to the tune of any of the others. Historically, lyrics were not always wedded to tunes and would therefore be sung to any fitting melody; "Amazing Grace", for instance, was not set to the tune "New Britain" (with which it is most commonly associated today) until fifty-six years after its initial publication in 1779.

Variants
Common metre is related to other poetic forms.

Ballad metre
Like common metre, ballad metre comprises couplets of tetrameter (four feet) and trimeter (three feet). However, the feet need not be iambs (with one unstressed and one stressed syllable): the number of unstressed syllables is variable. Ballad metre is "less regular and more conversational" than common metre.

In each stanza, ballad form typically needs to rhyme only the second lines of the couplets, not the first, in the form A-B-C-B (where A and C need not rhyme), while common metre typically rhymes both the first lines and the second lines, in the pattern A-B-A-B.

Fourteener

The fourteener is a metrical line of 14 syllables (usually seven iambic feet).

Fourteeners typically occur in couplets. Fourteener couplets broken into quatrains (four-line stanzas) are equivalent to quatrains in common metre or ballad metre: instead of alternating lines of tetrameter and trimeter, a fourteener joins the tetrameter and trimeter lines to give seven feet per line.

The fourteener gives the poet  greater flexibility than common metre, in that its long lines invite the use of variably placed caesuras and spondees to achieve metrical variety, in place of a fixed pattern of iambs and line breaks.

Common-metre double and particular
Another common adaptation of the common metre is the common-metre double, which as the name suggests, is the common metre repeated twice in each stanza, or 8.6.8.6.8.6.8.6.  Traditionally the rhyming scheme should also be double the common metre and be a-b-a-b-c-d-c-d, but it often uses the ballad metre style, resulting in x-a-x-a-x-b-x-b. Examples of this variant are "America the Beautiful" and "It Came Upon the Midnight Clear".  Likewise related is the common particular metre, 8.8.6.8.8.6., as in the tune Magdalen College, composed in 1774 by William Hayes, which has been used with the hymn "We Sing of God, the Mighty Source", by Christopher Smart.

Examples

Common metre is often used in hymns, like this one by John Newton.

William Wordsworth's "Lucy Poems" are also in common metre.

Many of the poems of Emily Dickinson use ballad metre.

Another American poem in ballad metre is Ernest Thayer's "Casey at the Bat":

A modern example of ballad metre is the theme song to Gilligan's Island, infamously making it possible to sing any other ballad to that tune. The first two lines actually contain anapaests in place of iambs. This is an example of a ballad metre which is metrically less strict than common metre.

Another example is the folk song "House of the Rising Sun".

"Gascoigns Good Night", by George Gascoigne, employs fourteeners.

"America the Beautiful" by Katharine Lee Bates employs the common metre double, using a standard CM rhyme scheme for the first iteration, and a ballad metre scheme for the second.

Likewise "Advance Australia Fair" by Peter Dodds McCormick, Australia's national anthem: 

The Pokémon Theme song is also in common meter and people have produced videos with the Pokémon Theme instrumentals with the words of Emily Dickinson poems.

See also
 Foot (prosody) 
 Hymn tune 
 Hymnology 
 Hymns and hymn tunes 
 Long metre
 Metre (hymn) 
 Metre (poetry)
 Short metre

References 

Poetic rhythm